Associazione Sportiva Dilettantistica San Luigi Calcio, or simply San Luigi, is an Italian association football club located in Trieste, Friuli-Venezia Giulia. It currently plays in Eccellenza Friuli-Venezia Giulia.

The club takes its name from San Luigi, district of Trieste.

History
The club was established on 1 August 1951 under the name of A.S. Esperia (Esperia means "land of the West", name given by the ancient Greeks to the Italian peninsula for being located west of Greece, in the direction indicated by the Star Of Hope), with Mario Basso as president and headquarters in via Raffineria and pitch in Servola.
In the 1951–52 season the adventure starts with the participation of the first team in Terza Categoria league and an Allievi (under 16 years old) team in the youth league.
In 1963 the home field was closed to make place for the construction of public housing, given that in that period the district of San Luigi was developing and the president Basso agreed to move the headquarters to via dei Mille, on the hill of San Luigi; then, on 20 June 1972, the name changes in Esperia San Luigi. As members of the board of directors enter former players who give impetus to a new course in the youth sector.
In the 1975–76 season the youth sector was expanded with the inclusion of teams in other categories. On 12 June 1979 the club takes the name A.C. San Luigi For You and Paolo Cecada was elected president, who was replaced in 1982 by Ezio Peruzzo.
Shortly thereafter, the headquarters were moved to the current prefabricated building close to the two playing fields.
On 31 May 1984 the club became A.C. San Luigi and later A.S.D. San Luigi since 2004. The club, in a few years, passes from the Terza Categoria to Promozione and Eccellenza and also to Serie D. Even the youth sector, which has over 200 young players, reaped successes. The flagship is the conquest of a title of Italian champions obtained by the Juniores (under 18 years old) team in the 2003–04 season. A real source of pride for the green-and-white colors.

The 2014–15 season is very unlucky for San Luigi: runners-up in Promozione Cup and in the league against A.S.D. Torviscosa and in the play-offs against A.S.D. Flaibano. The revenge against Torviscosa comes in 2018: in the FVG Cup (the cup for the Eccellenza Friuli-Venezia Giulia teams), San Luigi wins. The following year, 2019, San Luigi wins the FVG Cup again (3–1 against A.S.D. Edmondo Brian) making it the first team to win this trophy for two consecutive years. In 2019 it also wins the league and climbs to Serie D for the first time in its history.

Recent seasons

Key

Honours
Eccellenza Friuli-Venezia Giulia (1st regional level)
Winners: 2018–19

Promozione Friuli-Venezia Giulia (2nd regional level)
Winners: 1992–93, 1997–98, 2007–08, 2015–16

Coppa Italia Dilettanti Friuli-Venezia Giulia
Winners: 2017–18, 2018–19

Colors and badge 
The team's colors are white and green.

References

External links
Official website 
San Luigi page @ friuligol.it
San Luigi page @ tuttocampo.it
San Luigi page @ facebook.com

San Luigi
San Luigi
San Luigi